John Cullen Simon (May 8, 1918 – August 2, 1980) was a Canadian professional ice hockey player who played 130 games in the National Hockey League with the Detroit Red Wings and Chicago Black Hawks between 1942 and 1945. He was born in Brockville, Ontario. Simon's name was added to the Stanley Cup in 1943 with Detroit. Cully is the brother of the former NHL player, Thain Simon.

Career statistics

Regular season and playoffs

External links
 

1918 births
1980 deaths
Canadian expatriates in the United States
Canadian ice hockey defencemen
Chicago Blackhawks players
Detroit Red Wings players
Ice hockey people from Ontario
Indianapolis Capitals players
Omaha Knights (AHA) players
Stanley Cup champions
Sportspeople from Brockville
Washington Lions players